Jaroslav "Jarek" Janiš (born 8 July 1983) is a Czech auto racing driver. In 2006 he is racing in the FIA GT Championship. He has taken three pole positions Brno, Dijon and the Hungaroring turning two of them into victories, teamed with Sascha Bert and occasionally former Formula One driver Andrea Montermini. Prior to 2006 he had done six GT Championship races, four of them in a Ferrari 360 Modena for the Menx team in 2003, taking a total of 17.5 points.

He was born in Olomouc, Czechoslovakia, and has a record in single-seater competition. Jarek finished 7th in the German Formula Ford series in 1999, and was 2nd in that series (and 4th in the European Formula Ford series) a year later. By the end of 2001 he had a chance to fill in for countryman Tomáš Enge in the final round of the International Formula 3000 series at Monza. He finished 3rd overall in the European series in 2002, and raced the international series in 2003. He made his Champ Car debut for Dale Coyne Racing in the penultimate race of 2004. He did some Formula Nippon in Japan in 2005.

He is a race driver for A1 Team Czech Republic in the A1 Grand Prix series.

Motorsports career results

Career summary

Complete International Formula 3000 results 
(key) (Races in bold indicate pole position; races in italics indicate fastest lap.)

Complete Deutsche Tourenwagen Masters results
(key) (Races in bold indicate pole position) (Races in italics indicate fastest lap)

† - Driver did not finish, but completed 90% of the race distance.
1 -  A non-championship one-off race was held in 2004 at the streets of Shanghai, China.

Complete Champ Car World Series results

Complete Italian/Euro Formula 3000 results
(key) (Races in bold indicate pole position; races in italics indicate fastest lap)

Complete F3000 International Masters results
(key) (Races in bold indicate pole position; races in italics indicate fastest lap)

Complete Formula Nippon results
(key)

Complete A1 Grand Prix results 
(key) (Races in bold indicate pole position) (Races in italics indicate fastest lap)

24 Hours of Le Mans results

FIA GT Championship results

References

External links 
 

1983 births
Living people
Czech racing drivers
German Formula Renault 2.0 drivers
Formula Renault Eurocup drivers
FIA GT Championship drivers
Champ Car drivers
Deutsche Tourenwagen Masters drivers
Formula Nippon drivers
Auto GP drivers
A1 Team Czech Republic drivers
German Formula Three Championship drivers
Sportspeople from Olomouc
International Formula 3000 drivers
Formula Palmer Audi drivers
24 Hours of Le Mans drivers
American Le Mans Series drivers
European Le Mans Series drivers
24 Hours of Spa drivers
24H Series drivers
Mercedes-AMG Motorsport drivers
A1 Grand Prix drivers
Kondō Racing drivers
Charouz Racing System drivers
ISR Racing drivers
Nordic Racing drivers
Dale Coyne Racing drivers
Team Rosberg drivers
Ma-con Motorsport drivers